An alicot is a stew or ragout made with poultry giblets and possibly the head, feet and wing tips, traditionally linked to the Béarn and Languedoc regions of southern France.

References

External links
Alicot recipe

French cuisine
Occitan cuisine
Spanish soups and stews
Chicken soups
Offal dishes
Stock (food)